Jennifer Ann Simmons (born November 17, 1980, née, Chisolm), better known by her stage name Jenny Simmons, is an American Christian music artist, formerly of the band Addison Road. Currently Jenny Simmons is a solo artist.

Early life
Simmons was born in Albuquerque, New Mexico on November 17, 1980, to missionary parents, Steve and Debbie Chisolm. Her youth included moving between New Mexico, Florida, Mississippi and Texas.

Personal life
Simmons met her husband and former Addison Road member Ryan Simmons while attending Baylor University. They have one child together, Annie, and reside in Nashville, TN.

Discography

Studio albums

Extended plays

Singles

References

External links
 

1980 births
Singers from Texas
Living people
21st-century American singers
21st-century American women singers